The Emperor's Secret, released on 8 September 2006, is the first Finnish computer-animated feature film.

Plot
The film stars the familiar characters from the Finnish TV show The Autocrats (a political satire of Finnish politics) in a fairy tale where the inhabitants of a small Finnish village have to defend themselves against a despotic emperor.

Voice cast
 
 Anna Bentley
 
 
 Jukka Puotila
 Krisse Salminen

See also
List of animated feature films
List of computer-animated films

References

External links
 

2006 films
2006 computer-animated films
2000s Finnish-language films
Finnish animated films
Finnish children's films
2000s children's animated films